Szczepiatyn  is a village in the administrative district of Gmina Ulhówek, within Tomaszów Lubelski County, Lublin Voivodeship, in eastern Poland, close to the border with Ukraine.

The village had a population of 256 people according to the 2011 census.

References

Szczepiatyn